Teodorico Ranieri of Orvieto (died 7 December 1306) was an Italian cardinal. He was archbishop of Pisa, and bishop of Palestrina.

In 1298 Ranieri was instrumental in the destruction of the city of Palestrina on the orders of Pope Boniface VIII, following the anti-papal revolt of the Colonna family.  He was then made a cardinal in December of that year, and in 1300 until his death was the Camerlengo of the Holy Roman Church.

1306 deaths
14th-century Italian cardinals
Cardinal-bishops of Palestrina
Roman Catholic archbishops of Pisa
14th-century Italian Roman Catholic archbishops
Camerlengos of the Holy Roman Church
Year of birth unknown